"Smile" is a song written by Keith Follesé and Chris Lindsey, and recorded by American country music band Lonestar. It was released in October 1999 as the third single and 10th track from their third album Lonely Grill. The song reached the top of the Billboard Hot Country Singles & Tracks chart.

Music video
The music video was directed by Trey Fanjoy, and premiered on CMT on October 30, 1999, during "The CMT Delivery Room". A portion of their previous single "Amazed" was played at the beginning of the video.

Charts

Year-end charts

References

1999 singles
1999 songs
Lonestar songs
Music videos directed by Trey Fanjoy
Song recordings produced by Dann Huff
Songs written by Keith Follesé
BNA Records singles
Songs written by Chris Lindsey
Country ballads